Yago da Silva Rocha (born 22 May 1994) is a Brazilian professional footballer who plays as a right back for Floresta.

Professional career
Yago made his professional debut with Boavista SC in a 1-0 Campeonato Carioca loss to Botagofo on 31 January 2015.

References

External links
 
 Yago Rocha at playmakerstats.com (English version of ogol.com.br)

1994 births
Living people
People from São Gonçalo, Rio de Janeiro
Brazilian footballers
Association football fullbacks
Sampaio Corrêa Futebol Clube players
Boavista Sport Club players
Tupi Football Club players
Bonsucesso Futebol Clube players
Olaria Atlético Clube players
Goiânia Esporte Clube players
Goiás Esporte Clube players
Clube Náutico Capibaribe players
Campeonato Brasileiro Série A players
Campeonato Brasileiro Série B players
Sportspeople from Rio de Janeiro (state)